London European Airways was a British airline based at Luton Airport that operated services from the United Kingdom to Amsterdam and Brussels in the late 1980s. It was taken over by Ryanair and operated as Ryanair Europe.

History
The company was formed in 1984 and applied to operate a business class service between Luton and Amsterdam using a Vickers Viscount.

Following the approval from the Department of Transport (DoT) to operate the route the twice-daily service started on 25 February 1985. The approval was challenged by Luton-based airline Euroflite, the DoT then changed the approval to allow both operators on the Luton-Amsterdam route. The airline was forced by this action to purchase Euroflite for £300,000.

On 17 February 1986, the airline suspended services following financial problems and the temporary removal of the operating licence. In November 1986 a £630,000 financial rescue package was proposed by Cathal Ryan and other directors of the Irish-airline Ryanair, they would then own 85% of the company. The proposal was accepted by the shareholders, the new owners decided that LEA and Ryanair would remain separate companies although Ryanair flights from Ireland would inter-line with the LEA services from Luton.

The airline was re-launched in April 1987 using a leased twin-engined BAC One-Eleven 500 jet airliner, with services to Amsterdam and Brussels starting on 22 May 1987.

In January 1988, the airline was renamed Ryanair Europe.

In January 1989, the airline ended its scheduled service to Brussels and started to concentrate on being a charter airline for Ryanair.

By 1991, the airline had reverted to the London European name and was operating five BAC One-Elevens. With the parent Ryanair making losses and move by them to fly from Stansted London European Airways ceased to operate.

Destinations
Luton - Amsterdam
Luton - Brussels
Luton - Rotterdam

Fleet
BAC One-Eleven 400
BAC One-Eleven 500
Short 330
Vickers Viscount 800

See also
 List of defunct airlines of the United Kingdom

References

Defunct airlines of the United Kingdom
Airlines established in 1984
Airlines disestablished in 1991
Defunct European low-cost airlines
Ryanair